Cancers is a peer-reviewed, open access, medical journal published by MDPI covering all fields of oncology. The editor-in-chief is Samuel C. Mok (The University of Texas MD Anderson Cancer Center). The Irish Association for Cancer Research (IACR) and the Signal Transduction Society (STS) are affiliated societies.

Abstracting and indexing 
The journal is abstracted and indexed in:

According to the Journal Citation Reports, the journal has a 2020 impact factor of 6.639.

References

External links 
 

English-language journals

Monthly journals
Publications established in 2009
Oncology journals
MDPI academic journals
Open access journals